Perry Payton was a state legislator in Mississippi. He represented Bolivar County, Mississippi in the Mississippi House of Representatives in 1884 and 1885. He also served as a justice of the peace.

On January 9, 1884 W. L. Love contested Payton's election victory but he was unsuccessful and Payton was listed as the representative for Bolivar.

He was born c. 1852 in Mississippi.

He was noted along with other "Negro" legislators as being part of a meeting planning involvement in laying a cornerstone for a monument to General Lee.

See also
African-American officeholders during and following the Reconstruction era

References

Members of the Mississippi House of Representatives
1852 births
American justices of the peace
19th-century American politicians
People from Bolivar County, Mississippi
African-American state legislators in Mississippi
19th-century African-American politicians
Year of death missing